These are the official results of the Women's 10 km Walk event at the 1997 World Championships, with the final held on Thursday 7 August 1997 in Athens, Greece. There were a total number of 41 participating athletes.

Medalists

Intermediates

Final

Qualifying heats
Held on Monday 4 August 1997

See also
 1992 Women's Olympic 10km Walk (Barcelona)
 1993 Women's World Championships 10km Walk (Stuttgart)
 1994 Women's European Championships 10km Walk (Helsinki)
 1996 Women's Olympic 10km Walk (Atlanta)
 1998 Women's European Championships 10km Walk (Budapest)
 1999 Women's World Championships 20km Walk (Seville)

References
 Results
 Die Leichtathletik-Statistik-Seite

W
Racewalking at the World Athletics Championships
1997 in women's athletics